Amphirissoa is a genus of minute sea snails, marine gastropod mollusks or micromollusks in the family Rissoidae.

Species
Species within the genus Amphirissoa include:

 Amphirissoa cyclostomoides Dautzenberg & Fischer H., 1897

References

Rissoidae
Monotypic gastropod genera